Nationalization (nationalisation in British English) is the process of transforming privately-owned assets into public assets by bringing them under the public ownership of a national government or state. Nationalization usually refers to private assets or to assets owned by lower levels of government (such as municipalities) being transferred to the state. Nationalization contrasts with privatization and with demutualization. When previously nationalized assets are privatized and subsequently returned to public ownership at a later stage, they are said to have undergone renationalization. Industries often subject to nationalization include the commanding heights of the economy – telecommunications, electric power, fossil fuels, railways, airlines, iron ore, media, postal services, banks, and water – though, in many jurisdictions, many such entities have no history of private ownership.

Nationalization may occur with or without financial compensation to the former owners. Nationalization is distinguished from property redistribution in that the government retains control of nationalized property. Some nationalizations take place when a government seizes property acquired illegally. For example, in 1945 the French government seized the car-maker Renault because its owners had collaborated with the 1940–1944 Nazi occupiers of France. In September 2021, Berliners voted to expropriate over 240,000 housing units, many of which were being held unoccupied as investment property.

Economists can distinguish between nationalization and socialization, which refers to the process of restructuring the economic framework, organizational structure, and institutions of an economy on a socialist basis. By contrast, nationalization does not necessarily imply social ownership and the restructuring of the economic system. By itself, nationalization has nothing to do with socialism – historically, states have carried out nationalizations for various different purposes under a wide variety of different political systems and economic systems.

Political support 

Nationalization was one of the major mechanisms advocated by reformist socialists and social democrats for gradually transitioning to socialism. In this context, the goals of nationalization were to dispossess large capitalists, redirect the profits of industry to the public purse, and establish some form of workers' self-management as a precursor to the establishment of a socialist economic system.

Although sometimes undertaken as part of a strategy to build socialism, more commonly nationalization was also undertaken and used to protect and develop industries perceived as being vital to a nation's competitiveness (such as aerospace and shipbuilding), or to protect jobs in certain industries.

Nationalization has had varying levels of support throughout history. In the United Kingdom after the Second World War, nationalization gained support by the Labour party and some social democratic parties throughout Western Europe. In the United States, nationalizing healthcare is often a topic of political disagreement and makes frequent appearances in debates between political candidates. A 2019 poll found that about half of residents support the measure, while half do not.

A re-nationalization occurs when state-owned assets are privatized and later nationalized again, often when a different political party or faction is in power. A re-nationalization process may also be called "reverse privatization". Nationalization has been used to refer to either direct state-ownership and management of an enterprise or to a government acquiring a large controlling share of a publicly listed corporation.

According to research by Paasha Mahdavi, leaders who consider nationalization face a dilemma: "nationalize and reap immediate gains while risking future prosperity, or maintain private operations, thereby passing on revenue windfalls but securing long-term fiscal streams." He argues that leaders "nationalize extractive resources to extend the duration of their power" by using "this increased capital to secure political support."

Economic analysis 

Nationalization can have positive and negative effects.  In 2019 research based on studies from Greenwich University found that the nationalization of key services such as water, bus, railways and broadband in the United Kingdom could save £13bn every year.

Conversely, an assessment from the Institute for Fiscal Studies found that it would add at least £150bn to the national debt and make it harder for the United Kingdom to hit its climate change targets. This analysis was based on the assumption that the UK Government would have to pay the market rate for these industries.

Nationalization can produce adverse effects, such as reducing competition in the marketplace, which in turn reduces incentives to innovation and maintains high prices. In the short run, nationalization can provide a larger revenue stream for government, but can cause the industry to falter in the longer run. The collapse of the Venezuelan oil industry, due to government mismanagement, is a case in point.

Expropriation 

Expropriation is the seizure of private property by a public agency for a purpose deemed to be in the public interest. It may also be used as a penalty for criminal proceedings. Unlike eminent domain, expropriation may also refer to the taking of private property by a private entity authorized by a government to take property in certain situations.

Due to political risks that are involved when countries engage in international business, it is important to understand the expropriation risks and laws within each of the countries in which business is conducted in order to understand the risks as an investor in that country.

Trends 
Studies have found that nationalization follows a cyclical trend. Nationalization rose in the 1960s and 1970s, followed by an increase in privatization in the 80s and 90s, followed again by an increase in nationalization in the 2000s and 2010s.

Marxist theory
The term appears as "expropriation of expropriators (ruling classes)" in Marxist theory, and also as the slogan "Loot the looters!" ("грабь награбленное"), which was very popular during the Russian October Revolution. The term is also used to describe nationalization campaigns by communist states, such as dekulakization and collectivization in the USSR.

However, nationalization is not a specifically socialist strategy, and Marxism's founders were skeptical of its value. As Engels put it:

Nikolai Bukharin also criticised the term 'nationalisation', preferring the term 'statisation' instead.

See also 

 Compulsory purchase
 Constitutional economics
 Confiscation
 Eminent domain
 List of nationalizations by country
 List of privatizations by country 
 Municipalization
 Planned economy
 Privatization
 Public ownership
 Railway nationalization
 Sequestration
 State ownership
 State capitalism
 State socialism
 State sector
 Statism

References

External links 

 , article on Indian public sector banks
 Time for Permanent Nationalization by economist Fred Moseley in Dollars & Sense, January/February 2009
 The Corporate Governance of Banks – a concise discussion of concepts and evidence
 

 
Economic policy
Economic systems
Ownership
Social democracy